The Best Narration is one of the annual Critics' Choice Documentary Awards. The award is given to the narrator and writer.

History
It was first presented at the fourth ceremony to Bruce Springsteen for Western Stars.

Winners and nominees

References

External links
Official website

Narration
Awards established in 2019
Voice acting awards